Kurt Alexander Eichenwald (born June 28, 1961) is an American journalist and a New York Times bestselling author of five books, one of which, The Informant (2000), was made into a motion picture in 2009. Formerly he was a senior writer and investigative reporter with The New York Times, Condé Nast's business magazine, Portfolio, and later was a contributing editor with Vanity Fair and a senior writer with Newsweek. Eichenwald had been employed by The New York Times since 1986 and primarily covered Wall Street and corporate topics such as insider trading, accounting scandals, and takeovers, but also wrote about a range of issues including terrorism, the Bill Clinton pardon controversy, federal health care policy, and sexual predators on the Internet.

Early life and education
Eichenwald was born in 1961. He has stated that he is "Episcopalian with a Jewish father." He graduated from St. Mark's School of Texas in Dallas and Swarthmore College. His extracurricular activities during his time at Swarthmore included being a founding member of Sixteen Feet, an a cappella vocal octet.

During his first months of college, Eichenwald sustained a concussion, which was soon followed by noticeable epileptic seizures. Diagnosed with epilepsy in November of his freshman year, he continued to attend school despite repeated grand mal seizures.

After having two outdoor seizures on campus, he was dismissed from Swarthmore, in apparent violation of federal law. He contacted the United States Department of Health and Human Services and fought his way back into school, an experience that he has credited with giving him the willingness to take on institutions in his muckraking reporting. He graduated with his class in 1983, receiving a degree in political science, with distinction.

Career at The New York Times

Following a year at the Election and Survey Unit at CBS News, Eichenwald joined The New York Times in 1985 as a news clerk for Hedrick Smith, the paper's chief Washington correspondent. When Smith began writing his book The Power Game, Eichenwald became his research assistant, leaving in 1986 to become associate editor at The National Journal in Washington. During those years, he was a frequent contributor to The New York Times op-ed page, writing humorous pieces about political issues.

Eichenwald returned to The New York Times later in 1986 as a news clerk for the national desk in New York, participating in the paper's writing program for aspiring reporters. By 1988, he had been named The New York Times’ Wall Street reporter.

His arrival on Wall Street coincided with the explosion of white-collar criminal investigations in finance. He wrote about the stock trading scandals involving speculator Ivan Boesky and junk bond king Michael Milken, as well as the Treasury markets scandal at Salomon Brothers. He also covered the excesses of the takeover era, including the biggest deal of the time, the acquisition of RJR Nabisco by Kohlberg Kravis Roberts & Company.

In 1995, Eichenwald began writing about assorted corporate misdeeds. He wrote a multi-part series for The New York Times, exposing significant deficiencies in the American business of providing kidney dialysis treatments. The series led to a review by the Clinton Administration of ways to create financial incentives to improve quality in dialysis treatment, a focus of Eichenwald’s series. The articles were honored in 1996 with a George Polk Award for excellence in journalism, the first of two that he was awarded.

After his dialysis series, he joined with Martin Gottlieb, a health reporter with the newspaper, in a multi-year investigation of Columbia/HCA Healthcare Corporation, which at the time was the largest health-care company in the world. The investigation, which led to not only multiple articles in the paper and a criminal investigation of Columbia, but also significant changes in the way the federal government compensated hospitals, according to Bruce Vladek, then the head of the Medicare program. An article in the magazine Content cited the work by Eichenwald, Gottlieb and two other reporters as the year’s best public-service journalism. Eichenwald received his second Polk award, along with his colleagues, for this work.

In 1998, Eichenwald was attached to The New York Times’ senior reporter program. He also teamed with another of the newspaper's reporters, Gina Kolata, for a multi-year investigation into how business interests affect the nation's system for medical research. The articles explored drug and device testing, and pointed out how the interplay between insurance companies and the courts had prevented the testing of experimental procedures, including the use of bone-marrow transplants for the treatment of breast cancer. The articles were credited with driving new policies by American insurance companies that allowed for reimbursement to participants in federally approved medical studies for the treatment of cancer. Eichenwald and Kolata both were honored as finalists for the Pulitzer Prize for their work.

With the explosion of corporate scandals in 2002 – Enron, WorldCom, Arthur Andersen, Tyco and others – Eichenwald reported on the unfolding scandals and becoming a television fixture on such programs as Charlie Rose and The NewsHour with Jim Lehrer in explaining the meaning of the latest developments. Eichenwald, along with several other New York Times reporters, was selected as a finalist for the Pulitzer Prize in 2003 for his work on the corporate scandals.

In 2005, he wrote a group of New York Times articles about online child pornography. One of those articles was about Justin Berry, a then-18-year-old who operated pornographic websites featuring himself and other teen males. For this reporting, Eichenwald received the Payne Award for Ethics in Journalism for "preserving the editorial integrity of an important story while reaching out to assist his source, Justin Berry, in reporting on Berry’s involvement in child pornography." 

Five months after publication of the article, Eichenwald and Berry both gave Congressional testimony about online child abuse before a subcommittee of the House Committee on Energy and Commerce. Eichenwald claimed in the testimony that he had stumbled across Berry while reporting on documents that proved to be fraudulent, leaving him believing there was no story but fearful there was a child in danger. "I began trying to figure out if it was real, not for the purpose of doing a story because truthfully I did not, it did not occur to me there would be a story there," Eichenwald testified.

After confirming that Berry was a real person in danger, Eichenwald testified, he along with two others launched an effort to rescue the young man. Weeks after that effort had been completed, during which Eichenwald met Berry, Berry contacted him and said he wanted to reveal everything he knew about the online child pornography business for a news article in hopes of "bringing down" the illicit enterprise.

In 2007 it came to light that Eichenwald had given Berry an undisclosed $2,000 before writing the reports; The New York Times published a note stating that "the check should have been disclosed to editors and readers". During his testimony that same day as a prosecution witness against one of Berry's abusers, Eichenwald said he and his wife had used the money as a means of forcing Berry to reveal his identity during the rescue effort. Eichenwald testified that when Berry offered to become a source for a news article, he told the young man that he could not begin any reporting until the financial conflict was resolved by Berry's returning the money to him from a lawful source of funds. Eichenwald testified that Berry obtained a loan from his grandmother which he used to repay him in July 2005, at which point the reporting began.

Condé Nast Portfolio
In the fall of 2006 Eichenwald left The New York Times and joined the staff of newly created business magazine Condé Nast Portfolio as a senior writer.  He was recruited by Jim Impoco, a former New York Times editor and managing editor of the new Portfolio. The first edition of the magazine was published in April 2007. However, both Eichenwald and Impoco had a very short tenure at Portfolio.  An Eichenwald article about terrorism that had been championed by Impoco was killed by editor-in-chief Joanne Lipman, leading to a significant dispute between the two editors. After several months of tension between them, Lipman fired Impoco in August 2007;<ref>Memo Pad: Lipman Strikes Back…, Women's Wear Daily", August 8, 2007.</ref> Eichenwald resigned on the same day. Portfolio was not a commercial success, and was closed in April 2009. The failure of such a high-profile project was seen as a major setback for Condé Nast.

Vanity Fair and Newsweek
In 2012, Eichenwald joined Vanity Fair as a contributing editor where he wrote business articles for the magazine and an  online column focusing on government and politics. In 2013, while continuing his work for Vanity Fair he joined Newsweek as a senior writer. 

Books
Eichenwald's reporting on Prudential led to his first book, Serpent on the Rock (1995), which focused primarily on the limited partnership scandal at Prudential Securities, which is alleged to have defrauded 340,000 people out of eight billion dollars. The book was positively reviewed by Kirkus reviews, with a comparison to the bestseller Barbarians at the Gate.

In 2000, he published his second book, The Informant. While still a business book, The Informant was much more of a non-fiction police procedural depicting the inner workings of the FBI in detail. The book was subsequently adapted as the feature film a film adaptation. The movie, a dark comedy directed by Steven Soderbergh and starring Matt Damon, was released in 2009.

Eichenwald's investigation of Enron led to his third and most successful book, Conspiracy of Fools (2005). The book made The New York Times  bestseller list in April 2005. The book was marketed as "a gripping corporate thriller with more plot twists than a John Grisham novel" by Random House.
It was optioned as a movie by Warner Brothers, to potentially star Leonardo DiCaprio. However, the film was never made.

In 2012, he published his fourth book, 500 Days. Also a New York Times bestseller, the book chronicled the events in governments around the world in the 500 days after the 9/11 attacks. It revealed details of the American program of NSA eavesdropping, torture policy, the American government's briefings on the coming attacks before 9/11, and the details of debates within the British government.

Eichenwald's fifth book, A Mind Unraveled, was published in 2018 by Random House. The book is a memoir about  medical struggles that almost killed Eichenwald when he was a young man.

Awards and recognition
Eichenwald is a two-time winner of the George Polk Award for Excellence in Journalism in 1995 and 1997, for articles about the dialysis industry and fraud at the nation's largest hospital company, Columbia/HCA Healthcare Corporation. He was a finalist for the Pulitzer Prize in 2000, along with his New York Times colleague Gina Kolata, for an investigation of medical clinical trials. In 2006, he won the Payne Award for Ethics in Journalism and the Best in Business Enterprise Award from the Society of American Business Editors and Writers.

Personal life
Epilepsy
In a 1987 article about his illness for The New York Times Magazine, Eichenwald wrote about his epilepsy diagnosis at the age of 18 in 1979:

The doctor warned me – and so did members of my family soon afterward – that if I did not keep my epilepsy a secret, people would fear me and I would be subject to discrimination. Even now, seven years after that scene in the dining hall, it is difficult for me to say that I have epilepsy. Back then, it was impossible. In the years since, I have had hundreds of various types of seizures. I have experienced the mental, physical and emotional side effects caused by changes in the anticonvulsant drugs I take each day. Yet, for the first two years, I refused to learn about epilepsy. My fears of being found out were my real concern.

His willingness to reveal his personal battle to readers won him praise. He was awarded a journalism prize from the Epilepsy Foundation of America for his 1987 article. In a 2002 NewsBios'' article titled "Kurt Succeeded Where So Many Others Would Have Quit," Dean Rotbart wrote:

While Eichenwald has never since hidden his epilepsy, he also didn't make it a centerpiece of his life. After writing his story, his mission was clear and it was not to become a poster boy for the illness. "My whole life from the time I got sick was focused on making sure that I was a student, a journalist, a husband, and a father," Kurt tells me. "Not that I was someone with this condition."

In late 2016 after making critical remarks about Donald Trump, Eichenwald was intentionally sent epileptogenic GIFs over Twitter. He said the second attempt, in mid December following an interview about his Trump claims with Tucker Carlson, succeeded in causing him to have a seizure and that he would be taking a short break from Twitter while he pursued legal action against the user that sent the image. In March 2017, a Maryland man was arrested in connection with the incident and charged with cyberstalking. The federal cyberstalking charge was later dropped, although he still faces one count of aggravated assault, with the tweet being considered "a deadly weapon." The trial of the suspect began on December 16, 2019. In September 2020, Eichenwald won the lawsuit, though the criminal trial is still pending.

Family
Eichenwald is married to Theresa Pearse, an internist. They have three children.

Bibliography

References

External links
 
 

1961 births
21st-century American journalists
21st-century American writers
American business writers
American economics writers
American investigative journalists
American male journalists
American people of Jewish descent
American technology writers
George Polk Award recipients
Journalists from Texas
Living people
The New York Times writers
Newsweek people
St. Mark's School (Texas) alumni
Swarthmore College alumni
People with epilepsy
Vanity Fair (magazine) people
Writers from Dallas